Paravietnura notabilis, is a genus of Springtails belonging to the family Neanuridae.

Body length without antennae is 0.85 mm. Body with blue pigmented. Body tubercles well developed. Two pigmented 2+2 black eyes found on each side of head. Mouth parts reduced. Body stumpy and relatively short. Ordinary chaetae possess four types - long macrochaetae, short macrochaetae, very short macrochaetae and mesochaetae.

References

Neanuridae